Greatest Hits is a greatest hits album by American band Earth, Wind & Fire, released on November 17, 1998, by Columbia/Legacy Records. The album reached No. 40 on the Billboard 200 albums chart. The album was re-issued in 2008 by Columbia/Legacy.

Critical reception

Terry Lawson of the Detroit Free Press called Greatest Hits a "stellar single disc distillation" and a "shimmering state of sonic funk perfection". Stephen Thomas Erlewine of AllMusic described the LP as "a terrifically entertaining and valuable disc". Jim DeRogatis of the Chicago Sun Times also described the album as "worth owning".

Track listing

Personnel

Robert Appere:      Engineer
Dorothy Ashby:      Harp
Philip Bailey:  Congas, Percussion, Vocals
Marilyn Baker:      Viola
Roland Bautista:    Guitar
Delores M. Bing:    Cello
George Bohannon:    Trombone
Oscar Brashear:     Trumpet
Elmer Brown:        Trumpet
Garnett Brown:      Trombone
Sherman Bryana:     Violin
Bobby Bryant:       Trumpet
Denyse Buffum:      Viola
David Campbell:     Viola
Ronald Clark:       Violin
Ronald Cooper:     Cello
Larry Corbett:     Cello
Steve Crimmel:     Engineer
Paulinho Da Costa: Percussion
Rollice Dale:        Viola
Rahmlee Michael Davis: Flugelhorn, Trumpet
Eduardo del Barrio: Keyboards, Piano, Synthesizer
George Del Barrio: Keyboards, Piano, Synthesizer
Marci Dicterow:     Violin
Assa Drori:         Violin
David Duke:         French Horn
James Dunham:       Viola
Larry Dunn:      Associate Producer, Organ, Piano, Programming, Synthesizer
The Emotions:  Vocals (Background)
Pavel Farkas:     Violin
Marie Fera:       Cello
Henry Ferber:     Violin
Chuck Findley:    Trumpet
David Foster:     Keyboards, Piano, String Arrangements, Synthesizer
Winterton Garvey: Violin
Pamela Gates:     Violin
Harris Goldman:   Concert Master, Violin
Joseph Goodman:   Violin
Richard Goodman:  Engineer
Jack Gootkin:     Violin
Janice Gower:     Concert Master
Gary Grant:       Trumpet
Mick Guzauski:    Engineer
Michael Harris:   Flugelhorn, Trumpet

Jeanette Hawes:    Vocals (Background)
Jerry Hay:         Horn Arrangements
Marlo Henderson:   Guitar
William Henderson: Violin
Jerry Hey:         Trumpet
Zakir Hussain:     Tabla
Wanda Hutchinson:  Vocals (Background)
Fred Jackson, Jr.: Saxophone
Ralph Johnson: Drums, Percussion
Thomas "Snake" Johnson: Tuba
Dennis Karmazyn:  Cello
Jan Kelley:       Cello
Rick Kelly:       Keyboards, Piano, Synthesizer
Barbara Korn:      French Horn
Gina Kronstadt:    Violin
Carl LaMagna:      Violin
Azar Lawrence:     Keyboards, Piano, Synthesizer
Richard Lepore:    Timpani
Maxine Lewis:      Keyboards, Piano, Synthesizer
Linda Lipsett:     Viola
Joseph Livoti:     Violin
Charles Loper:     Trombone
Steve Lukather: Guitar
Jacqueline Lustgarten: Cello
Joy Lyle:          Violin
Steve Madaio:      Trumpet
Arthur Maebe:      French Horn
Virginia Majewski: Viola
Miguel Martinez:   Cello
Harvey Mason, Sr.: Percussion
George Massenburg: Engineer
Lew McCreary:      Trombone
Al McKay:      Guitar, Percussion, Producer, Vocals
Bill Meyers:       Horn Arrangements, String Arrangements
Sidney Muldrow:    French Horn
Billy Myers:       Keyboards, Piano, Synthesizer
Don Myrick:        Saxophone
Ross Pallone:      Engineer
Richard Perissi:   French Horn
Tom Perry:         Engineer
Jerry Peters:      Keyboards, Piano, Synthesizer
The Phoenix Horns: Band
Paul Polivnick:   Viola
Steve Porcaro:    Keyboards, Piano, Synthesizer

Benjamin Powell:  Trombone
William Frank "Bill" Reichenbach Jr.:  Trombone
Jerome Reisler:   Violin
Jerome Richardson: Saxophone
Herman Riley:     Saxophone
Marilyn Robinson: French Horn
Dean Rod:         Engineer
James Ross:       Viola
Henry Roth:       Violin
Sheldon Sanov:      Violin
Louis Satterfield: Trombone
Skip Scarborough:   Keyboards, Piano, Synthesizer
Sandy Seemore:      Violin
Anton Sen:          Violin
Leena Sherman:      Violin
Haim Shtrum:        Violin
Harry Shultz:       Cello
Daniel Smith:       Cello
Robert Spano:       Engineer
Maurice Spears:     Trombone
Charles Stepney:  Arranger, Associate Producer, Keyboards, Piano, Producer, Synthesizer
Linn Subotnick:   Viola
Ilka Talvi:       Violin
Judith Talvi:     Violin
Beloyd Taylor:    Guitar, Vocals (Background)
Barbara Thomason: Viola
Tom Tom 84:       Arranger, Horn Arrangements, String Arrangements
Kevan Torfeh:     Cello
Rosmen Torfeh:    Violin
Wayne Vaughn:     Keyboards, Piano, Synthesizer
Charles Veal:      Concert Master
John Walz:         Cello
Jerome Webster:    Violin
Fred White:    Drums, Percussion
Maurice White: Compilation Producer, Drums, Kalimba, Producer, Timbales, Vocals
Verdine White:   Associate Producer, Bass, Percussion, Vocals
Sheila Whitt:       Vocals (Background)
Craig Widby:        Engineer
Mark Wilder:        Mastering
Joseph Wissert: Producer
Larry Woods: Viola
Andrew Woolfolk: Flute, Percussion, Sax (Soprano), Sax (Tenor)
Benjamin F. Wright: Horn Arrangements, String Arrangements
Ken Yerke: Violin

Charts

Certifications

References

1998 albums
1998 greatest hits albums
Earth, Wind & Fire compilation albums
Albums produced by Maurice White
Albums produced by Joe Wissert
Albums produced by Charles Stepney
Columbia Records albums
Columbia Records compilation albums